Ukiangong Point is the southwesternmost point on Butaritari atoll located in the Pacific Ocean island nation of Kiribati.  It is located on the islet of Tabonohobi.

World War II

Ukiangong Point was fired upon by the  shortly after 7 AM on August 17, 1942, after the submarine and the  had dropped Lieutenant Colonel Evans F. Carlson's Marine Raiders on the ocean side of  Butaritari Island  as part of the Makin Raid.  Later in the war, the capture of Ukiangong point was an early objective in the U.S. Army's assault on Butaritari on November 20, 1943.

Notes

References

Butaritari